Heterokrohnia is a genus of chaetognaths in the family Heterokrohniidae.

Species
Heterokrohnia alvinae Casanova, 1992
Heterokrohnia angeli Casanova, 1994
Heterokrohnia bathybia Marumo & Kitou, 1966
Heterokrohnia biscayensis Casanova, 1994
Heterokrohnia curvichaeta Casanova, 1986
Heterokrohnia davidi Casanova, 1986
Heterokrohnia discoveryi Casanova, 1994
Heterokrohnia fragilis Kapp & Hagen, 1985
Heterokrohnia furnestinae Casanova & Chidgey, 1987
Heterokrohnia heterodonta Casanova, 1986
Heterokrohnia involucrum Dawson, 1968
Heterokrohnia longidentata Kapp & Hagen, 1985
Heterokrohnia mirabilis von Ritter-Záhony, 1911
Heterokrohnia mirabiloides Casanova & Chidgey, 1990
Heterokrohnia murina Casanova, 1986
Heterokrohnia wishernae Casanova, 1992

References

Chaetognatha